Goodbye for Now may refer to:

"Goodbye for Now" (Desperate Housewives), an episode of the television series Desperate Housewives
"Goodbye for Now" (song), a song by P.O.D.
"Goodbye for Now", a song by Stephen Sondheim from the film Reds, also recorded by Barbra Streisand